Seward Johnson may refer to:
John Seward Johnson I (1895 – May 23, 1983),  Seward Johnson and J. Seward Johnson 
John Seward Johnson II (1930 – March 10, 2020), a.k.a. J. Seward Johnson, Jr. and Seward Johnson, American sculptor, son of the above